Nicolae Petrescu may refer to:
Nicolae Petrescu Găină (1871–1931), cartoonist
Nicolae Petrescu-Comnen (1881–1958), diplomat, politician, and humanitarian
Nicolae Petrescu (footballer) (1913–1991), Romanian footballer and manager